Clark W. McDonnell (May 19, 1870 – May 15, 1952) was a North Dakota Republican Party politician who served as a North Dakota Public Service Commissioner from 1941 to 1950. Prior to 1941, his title was North Dakota Railroad Commissioner. He had served in that position since 1920.

Biography
Clark McDonnell was born in Nova Scotia, Canada in 1870. He came to Minnesota in 1883, and began work for the Soo Line Railroad in 1892 as a telegraph operator in Paynesville, Minnesota. He came to Kensal, North Dakota as an agent for the Soo Line in March 1893, and stayed in that position until 1905. He left the railroad industry that year and operated a dray and ice business in Kensal for the next five years. He operated a farm in Foster County from 1909 to 1923, and served in the North Dakota House of Representatives from 1917 to 1920 in the 32nd district. He was elected as North Dakota Railroad Commissioner in 1920. The Railroad Commission became known as the North Dakota Public Service Commission in 1940, and McDonnell served until 1950 when, after winning the Republican primary, he withdrew his name from the ballot in September, and retired at the age of 80. He died two years later aged 81 in Bismarck.

Notes

Members of the North Dakota House of Representatives
North Dakota Public Service Commissioners
1870 births
1952 deaths